Dorothy Wind [״Dottie״] was a shortstop who played from  through  in the All-American Girls Professional Baseball League.

Born in Chicago, Illinois, Dorothy Wind was one of the sixty founding members of the All-American Girls Professional Baseball League in its inaugural season. She also played basketball and volleyball before joining the league with the Racine Belles, a team managed by former big leaguer Johnny Gottselig.

A good defending shortstop, Wind formed part of a stellar Racine infield that included Margaret Danhauser at first base, Sophie Kurys at second base and Maddy English at third base.

In 1943 Wind batted a .255 average and stole 36 bases, driving in 44 runs and scoring 56 times, while connecting four doubles, seven triples and two home runs. She finished 7th in RBI, tied for 6th in triples and tied for 11th in homers. But her career highlight came on August 28, when she set the league all-time record with six hits in a single game. The Belles swept the Kenosha Comets in the championship series, three games to zero.

Wind attended college in the off-season. She hit .240 in 1944, but did not return for the next year.

Career statistics
Batting

Fielding

Sources

All-American Girls Professional Baseball League players
Year of birth missing
Place of death missing
Year of death missing
Baseball players from Chicago